Miss U Much is an American reality television series that airs on VH1 and debuted on July 19, 2013. It is hosted by Catherine Reitman, and provides viewers with updates on stars from the 1990s and early 2000s.

Episodes

References

External links
 

2010s American reality television series
2012 American television series debuts
English-language television shows
VH1 original programming
2013 American television series endings